The South Australia International in badminton, is an international open held in Adelaide, Australia. The tournament sanctioned by the Badminton World Federation and part of the Badminton Oceania circuit.

Previous winners

Performances by nation

References 

Badminton tournaments in Australia
Sports competitions in Adelaide